Petter Johan Thomassen (17 April 1941 – 8 October 2003) was a Norwegian politician for the Conservative Party.

Early years
He was born in Salangen as a son of farmers Karl Thomassen (1905–1978) and Johanna, née Grimstad (1914–1996). He finished his secondary education in Trondheim in 1960, and took the siv.øk. degree in Copenhagen in 1963. He was the manager of Nordlandsdata in Bodø from 1965 to 1976.

Career
He was a member of Bodø municipal council from 1967 to 1975. He was also a member of Nordland county council. From 1976 to 1977 he was chairman (fylkesrådsleder) of Nordland's county cabinet. In his party he was a central board member of the Norwegian Young Conservatives from 1969 to 1971, and central board member of the Conservative Party from 1976 to 1990. From 1988 to 1990 he was the second deputy leader of his party.

He was elected to the Parliament of Norway from Nordland in 1977, and was re-elected on four occasions; in 1981, 1985, 1989 and 1993. He chaired one Standing Committee during his time, the Standing Committee on Finance from 1983 to 1985. He had previously served as a deputy representative during the term 1969–1973. From 1985 to 1986, while Willoch's Second Cabinet held office, Thomassen served as the Minister of Industry. During this period his seat in parliament was taken by Harry Danielsen. From 1989 to 1990 Thomassen served as Minister of Trade in Syse's Cabinet. During this period his seat in parliament was taken by Steinar Høgaas.

He chaired Nordland District College (1976 to 1978), Dataringen (1971 to 1973, board member 1968 to 1976), Nordlandsforskning (1980 to 1985, 1986 to 1988), Polarsirkelsenteret (1988 to 1990), Norsk Luftfartssenter (1994 to 1998), Polar Park (1994 to 2001), Bodø Energi (1996 to 2003), Nordland Teater (1999 to 2003) and Store Norske Spitsbergen Kulkompani (2003). He was a board member of Norske datasentralers landsforbund (1972 to 1974) and the Norwegian Electricity Industry Association (1998 to 2003). He authored numerous books.

References

1941 births
2003 deaths
Politicians from Bodø
Businesspeople in computing
Nordland politicians
Conservative Party (Norway) politicians
Members of the Storting
Government ministers of Norway
Norwegian non-fiction writers
20th-century Norwegian politicians
20th-century non-fiction writers
People from Salangen
Ministers of Trade and Shipping of Norway